Edward Meldrum  FRSE DL (1821–1875) was a Scottish chemist who was partner to James Young in his oil and paraffin ventures creating the company Young & Meldrum and the independent company of Meldrum & Co in Glasgow.

Life

He was born in 1821 in Kirkcaldy in Fife. He was educated at Kirkcaldy and then St Andrews.

He gained early experience at Muspratt's Chemical Works in Liverpool. Here in 1842 he encountered and befriended the company's manager, James Young. In 1848 he went into partnership with Young in the petrol works at Alfreton discovered by Lyon Playfair. When Young made his famous paraffin discoveries near Bathgate it was Meldrum with whom he formed a business partnership to extract the paraffin.

In 1855 he was running the oil firm of Meldrum & Co from 33, 35 Great Dovehill in Glasgow.

In 1863 he was elected a Fellow of the Royal Society of Edinburgh. His proposers was Lyon Playfair.

In 1866 he formed with P McLagan MP to create the Uphall Mineral Company. At this time he acquired and rebuilt Dechmont House nearby, renaming it Dechmont Castle.

He was Deputy Lieutenant of Linlithgowshire.

He died at home in Dechmont on 13 June 1875.

Family

He was married with four children.

Artistic Recognition

His marble bust sculpted by William Brodie was presented to Bathgate Town Hall in 1876 by James Young.

References

1821 births
1875 deaths
People from Kirkcaldy
Scottish chemists
Fellows of the Royal Society of Edinburgh
19th-century Scottish businesspeople